The many allied military operations of the Vietnam War are listed on the following pages, either alphabetically, or chronologically.

Lists

By year
 List of allied military operations of the Vietnam War (1964)
 List of allied military operations of the Vietnam War (1965)
 List of allied military operations of the Vietnam War (1966)
 List of allied military operations of the Vietnam War (1967)
 List of allied military operations of the Vietnam War (1968)
 List of allied military operations of the Vietnam War (1969)
 List of allied military operations of the Vietnam War (1970)
 List of allied military operations of the Vietnam War (1971)
 List of allied military operations of the Vietnam War (1972)
 List of allied military operations of the Vietnam War (1973–1974)
 List of allied military operations of the Vietnam War (1975)

By name

See also
 First Indochina War
 Viet Cong insurgency
 Vietnamization
 Vietnam War casualties
 Aircraft losses of the Vietnam War

References
 Edwin E. Moïse (1996), Tonkin Gulf and the escalation of the Vietnam War, 304 pages
 Lewis Sorley (2007), A Better War, 528 pages
 Institute Of Medicine, Institute of Medicine (U.S.), National Academies Press (U.S.) (2007), Veterans and agent orange, 871 pages
 John M. Carland (2000), Combat Operations, 430 pages
 Marvin E. Gettleman (1995), Vietnam and America, 560 pages
 William Rosenau (2001), Special operations forces and elusive enemy ground targets, 60 pages
 Lyndon Baines Johnson (1971), The vantage point, 636 pages
 Mike McKinney (2003), Chariots of the Damned, 256 pages

External links
 HELICOPTER Operations in VIETNAM
 Special Operations in Vietnam
 Information About Records Relating to the Vietnam War Operations Analysis (OPSANAL) System
 Naval Operations in Vietnam

1960s conflicts
1970s conflicts

Military operations involving the United States
Military operations involving Vietnam
 
List of allied military operations of the Vietnam War
List of allied military operations of the Vietnam War